Velachery is a commercial and residential area in south Chennai, and is the largest commercial centre in south Chennai. It is surrounded by Guindy in the north, IIT Madras in the north-east, Taramani in the east, Perungudi in the south-east, Pallikaranai Wetland in the south, Madipakkam in the south and south-west, Adambakkam in the west and north-west. The growth of the neighbourhood during the last decade can be cited due to the growth of the IT sector in south Chennai. It acts as an important hub connecting the rapidly growing business-class information technology corridor popularly called the OMR; the more mature and very well-connected GST road and the central business districts of the city, which has more relevance to the history of Chennai. Velachery as a whole draws a perfect balance between old and new Chennai and is a phenomenon in terms of growth and development.

Development
The rapid growth of Velachery as a commercial and residential hub, could be attributed to its geographical advantage in terms of the connectivity to other parts of the city:

 The Velachery main road on the south, connects the fastest growing suburbs of south Chennai and Mount Road (Anna Salai) at Guindy via Velachery. A section of this road connects Guindy and Velachery and is home to some of the oldest localities.
 The 100 ft bypass road connects Guindy on the north west.
 The Taramani link road on the north east connects Velachery with Rajiv Gandhi Salai (OMR).
 The Jawaharlal Nehru Salai also called the 100 ft road or Inner Ring Road, Chennai passes along the MRTS line and connects near the airport the GST road, an arterial road in Chennai.
 The Taramani Link Road in Velachery also connects to MGR Salai, an arterial road that connects to OMR
 Velachery was under the Taluk of Mambalam-Guindy in Chennai District. In recent Mambalam-Guindy Taluk has been divided Velachery got their own Taluk named as Velachery Taluk. Dandeeswarar Temple is the oldest temple in the locality.

Etymology
Velachery has it origin in the Tamil words வேளர் (Velar meaning farmers) or வேளிர் (Velir - the name of older Tamilakam tribes) and the word சேரி (Cheri) which means a community. The name Veli Cheri is found in the Inscription (ARE Ref no 317) during era of Chola prince Aditya Karikalan (963-969 CE) in Selliamman Temple (referred as Kaala Padaari koyil).

Popular etymology also holds that Velachery has its origin in the Sanskrit term for the region, Vedasreni, translated as, 'refuge of the Vedas'.

History

Ancient period 

Velachery had existed as a village from as far back as the ninth century CE and earlier. Multiple kalvettu epigraphs confirm that the area was contemporary to other historical townships in the Tondaimandalam region of Tamilakam. The oldest kalvettus in Velachery are in the ancient Selliamman temple from the reigns of Parakesarivarman/Parantaka Chola (9th century) and Parthivendravarman. The Dhandeeswaram temple contains many epigraphs from the times of Gandaraditya Chola (10th century) and emperors Raja Raja Chola I and Rajendra Chola I (11th century).

During the 12th century, Velachery, along with the rest of Tondaimandalam, was thought to have briefly come under the rule of the Kadavas (or Kadavarayas) who were feudatory powers under the Cholas and subsequent Pandya emperors. An epigraph from king Kopperunjingan I of Sendamangalam of South Arcot region is found in Velachery.

As in other contemporary Madras regions, the Velachery epigraphs attest to the remarkable system of local administration systems under Pallavas and Cholas of Tamilakam. There was harmonious functioning of the institutions of central government along vast network of village 'sabaikal'/'sabhas' or assemblies which enjoyed considerable local autonomy and which were the real guardians of villages. The functioning of the sabaikal in places like Velachery, Kunrattur, Thirumazhisai, Poonamalle and Padi are well attested, with their composition of village elders and learned members of the community, and maintaining law order, levying taxes and ensuring the functioning of the economy. However, under the subsequent Vijayanagara empire and their feudatories, the power of the local assemblies seems to have progressively declined in favour of more centralized rule.

The Velachery kalvettus mention instances of an Alanganattar family (thought to be the title of the village elders) donation to the Dhandeeswaram temple, and of two people buying land from the sabai and donating them to the temple. Contemporary accounts from Kavanur near Tiruvottiyur describe how the village assemblies receiving money from individuals and agreeing to pay interest on it. It is clear that the village assemblies possessed the right of buying and disposing of land or other categories of properties owned jointly by the villagers for them and on their behalf.

A Chola record from Velachery mentions a Council of Justice, called Dharmasana, presided by the King and assisted by learned Brahmins, called Dharmasanabhattars. Lesser cases were decided by local courts named as Nyayattar.

In the epigraphs, some parts of the Velachery village were known as Dinachintamani Chaturvedimangalam in honor of land grants given to Brahmins for teaching the four Vedas. (In current times, the Mettu Theru areas of Dhandeeswaram are thought to correspond to the references). In such Brahmadeya villages or Agarams, the lands were held by the village in common on a tenure system known as Ganabhogam, cultivated under joint ownership by the community and the profits shared in proportion to the share held on the land. Another kalvettu mentions a sale of land by non-Brahmins with the permission of king Rajendra Chola I, indicating that even non-Brahmins held land in the Brahmadeya villages.

20th century and later
As Madras/Chennai city expanded in the late 20th century, Velachery became one of the prime residential neighbourhoods of Chennai. The American Advent Mission School has been functioning since the 1950s. The transformation of Velachery happened with the widening of Bypass Road in 2005 to a six-laned road, which gave ample opportunities for builders to commercially exploit the place.

Location
Velachery is surrounded by Guindy in the North, IIT Madras in the North-East, Taramani in the East, Perungudi in the South-East, Pallikaranai Wetland in the South, also Madiipakkam in the South & South-West, Adambakkam in the West & North-West.

Geography
Velachery mostly has areas of clay and hard rock. The Velachery lake was historically about 250 acres with the ancient Selliamman and Narasimhar temples on its Southern corner. South of Velachery, there were thousands of acres of marshland called Kazhuveli made of coarse elephant grass (called Kazhu Pul) and swamps. The area was also called Kazhiveli as it allowed rain water runoff and catchment. It had six natural spring aquifers that enabled groundwater table to be recharged. The marshland also was a sanctuary for resident and migratory birds. Beginning in the last decades of 20th century, the marshland all but disappeared due to rapid development and encroachment. The remaining southern portions of the marshland make up the Pallikaranai wetland.

Transportation

Air
The nearest airport to Velachery is the Chennai International Airport near Meenambakkam which is at a distance of ~. The shortest way to reach the airport is by using the Inner Ring Road (IRR)
which is less traffic prone. The other way is to go via Guindy using the GST-Anna Salai(Mount Road) route which is more traffic prone and it is the longest route. There are direct Volvo buses between the airport and Velachery operated by MTC. Autos (Indian Taxi) and Taxicab ply between Airport and Velachery at a nominal cost of ₹ 200-250 (US$4–5). MTC buses also ply on this route but one has to break the journey and change buses.

Road

Velachery is well connected to rest of the city by bus services operated by MTC.
Vijayanagar Bus Terminus is the major and biggest bus stand in the Velachery locality from where buses fly to various parts of the city.
There are three arterial roads: Velachery Main Road, Taramani Link Road, and Velachery Bypass Road. The Vijayanagar junction is one of the most important junctions in the city.

Rail
Station Code: VLCY--
Velachery is well connected by  broad gauge rail to the rest of the city through the Velachery MRTS Railway Station. The daily EMU services are operated by the Indian Railways.
The second part of the Mass Rapid Transit System (MRTS) between Tirumailai and Velachery was formally inaugurated by Dr.Karunanidhi(former CM of Tamil Nadu) in the presence of R.Velu (former Union Minister of State for Railways) and this became operational on 15 November 2007.

The project should have been completed two years before the opening date, but some technical snag, delayed the project. The Indian railway's original plan was to have an elevated track from Tirumailai(Mylapore) to Taramani and surface line from Taramani to Velachery. But as the soil was soft in and around Taramani and Perungudi, the railways had to go for the elevated track right up to Velachery, which took two more years for the project to complete. The MRTS extension work from Velachery to St. Thomas mount was expected to be completed by 2013 but still incomplete as of 2021. The extension work is going at snail's pace near St. Thomas Mount due to land acquisition and redistribution issues.

There are EMU services from Chennai Beach to Velachery at a minimum interval of 10 minutes and a maximum of 40 minutes.
The first service starts at 0500 hrs and the last service is at 2300 hrs during week-days 

\

Infrastructure

One of the major reasons for Velachery to become a residential attraction is the infrastructure. Even though most of the regions in Velachery are flood prone, major investments have gone in to improve the storm water drain network in the locality. The corporation has also invested in rail and road connectivity to Velachery from the central business districts of Chennai. 
Some major infrastructure projects which are being executed by the Chennai Corporation in Velachery are,

1. MRTS extension connecting Velachery with St. Thomas Mount.

The extension of the MRTS from Velachery to St. Thomas Mount is a long pending project which faced severe hardships since the last  stretch of land is to be acquired from densely populated residential localities of St. Thomas Mount. This project is likely to be completed soon, as the link is crucial to realize the maximum usage of the MRTS.

2. Construction of storm water drain connecting Velachery with South Buckingham canal.

The storm water drain network is being constructed underneath the 6 lane road connecting Velachery with Taramani. This project is funded by the world bank.

3. Construction of twin flyovers at the busy Vijayanagar junction in Velachery.

The busy Vijayanagar junction in Velachery is to dot with twin multilevel flyovers that connects three arterial roads namely Velachery-Tambaram main road, 100 feet bypass road and Taramani link road. These flyovers would bring much relief to the traffic-choked Vijayanagar junction.

4. Beautification of Velachery lake.

A detailed project report was prepared to make Velachery lake fit for boating and to make it a tourist attraction. The corporation has initiated a major development plan for Velachery lake since it is one of the very few surviving water bodies in the city. The lake also serves as a major groundwater recharge for the adjoining localities.

SDAT Aquatic Complex

The Velachery Aquatic Complex is a swimming pool complex with spectator facilities at Velachery. It was built by Sports Development Authority of Tamil Nadu (SDAT) for serving as one of the venues of the 1995 South Asian Games. Facilities available at the complex include one racing pool (50 × 25 m), one diving pool (18 × 25 m), one warm-up pool (20 × 25 m), VIP lobby and lounge, change rooms, shower cubicles, physiotherapy room, first aid, CCTV, control room, electronic score board, gym, commentator box and seating for 4,000 spectators.

The pool is open to the public for membership and offers fee concessions for swimming competition medal winners.

Infrastructure and environmental concerns

A major concern is that the recent rapid developments has also resulted in a few drawbacks, such as water scarcity, congestion of roads and the damage to the marshland. It is feared that in a few years unless something substantial is done, the marshlands would all be converted into residential and commercial properties.

Every November, Velachery is flooded by cyclonic rains. The major areas that are usually flooded are the low-lying areas around the Velachery Lake. A floodwater drainage canal was constructed along the Velachery 100-feet (30 m) road. Due to encroachments, some part of the canal in the Velachery-Tambaram high road is not constructed completely. Generally it is felt that, after the canal was built; to a major extent, the flooding problem in many areas along the 100-foot road has decreased substantially. All the residential colonies that are lying south of Taramani link road got submerged in rainwater during the floods in 2008 which was of moderate intensity. A major storm water drain project running all through the Taramani link road from Vijayanagar bus stand in Velachery connecting South Buckingham canal is in progress. This project which is funded by the World Bank, is expected to bring much relief to the residents of flood-prone Velachery.

There are also two big open to air dumping grounds. These spoil the underground water and are breeding grounds for mosquitoes and other flies and the frequent burning of the waste also creates a lot of pollution problems to the people especially those traveling past it. It is a favorite shooting location among filmmakers and has been filmed in as far as 3 movies.

Now that Velachery has become a separate assembly constituency the woes of its residents are expected to be mitigated at a faster pace.

Economy

Several IT/ITES companies have set up their offices in Velachery. Some major ones include Tata Consultancy Services (TCS), ZOHO Corp, AllSec Technologies. Laptopstore, Fyndus, TeleData and Sutherland Global Services. IT and working-class people prefer to settle in Velachery as more IT parks emerge on the Old Mahabalipuram road and its proximity to the Central Business Districts of Chennai. This part of Chennai was considered to be socio-economically backwards a decade ago, but the area has changed rapidly after a string of key residential projects. The standard of living in and around Velachery has increased considerably.

Phoenix Market City was opened in January 2013 at Velachery is one of India's Biggest shopping Malls  Further, The Grand Mall was also opened in 2013 near the Velachery railway station.

Colleges
 Guru Nanak College on Velachery main road.
 Jerusalem College of Engineering, Chennai is situated at the Velachery - Tambaram main road, Narayanapuram, Pallikaranai.
 Balaji Dental College & Hospital - Located adjacent to Jerusalem College of Engineering.

Schools
Notable schools in and around Velachery:
 St.Britto's Academy 
 Sivasakthi Matriculation School
 Guru Nanak Matriculation Higher Secondary School
 Bethel Matriculation Higher Secondary School
 ST Savio Matriculation Higher Secondary School
 Government Higher Secondary School (formerly known as Periyasamy school)
 DAV Public School
 AKG Public School
 Lakshmi Vidylaya
 AGM Matriculation Higher Secondary School
 Akshayah Matriculation Higher Secondary School
 David Matriculation Higher Secondary School, Gandhi Road
 The Chennai School (International Baccalaureate)
 Dav Baba Vidhyalaya, Vandikaran Street
 Arsha Vidya Mandir Higher Secondary School, Guindy
 Nehru High School
 San Academy Velachery

See also
Chennai
Chennai Mass Rapid Transit System
Pallikaranai wetland

References

External links

http://m.timesofindia.com/city/chennai/The-road-to-nowhere-in-Velachery/articleshow/42668607.cms

Neighbourhoods in Chennai